Semyonovka, also spelled Semenovka or Semënovka, may refer to:
Semyonovka, Armenia, a village in Armenia
Semënovka, former name of Qızılkənd, a village in Azerbaijan
Semyonovka, Russia, several inhabited localities in Russia
Semyonovka, alternative spelling of Semenivka, several locations in Ukraine
Semyonovka, Issyk Kul, a village in Kyrgyzstan

Notes

ru:Семёновка